Barry Thomas Freeman (born 28 February 1948) is a New Zealand former cricketer. He played eight first-class matches for Otago between 1969 and 1971.

Freeman was born at Dunedin in 1948 and educated at Otago Boys' High School in the city. His father, Thomas Freeman was a schoolteacher who also played first-class cricket for Otago.

References

External links
 

1948 births
Living people
New Zealand cricketers
Otago cricketers
Cricketers from Dunedin